Pasytheidae is a family of bryozoans belonging to the order Cheilostomatida.

Genera:
 Baudina Gordon, 2009
 Dittosaria Busk, 1866
 Eutaleola Vieira & Gordon, 2010
 Gemellipora Smitt, 1873
 Pasythea Lamouroux, 1812
 Tecatia Morris, 1980
 Unifissurinella Poignant, 1991

References

Cheilostomatida